Molefe Lekoekoe is a  Mosotho footballer.

Career
The midfielder joined in summer 2011 from Lesotho Defence Force FC to League rival Lioli Teyateyaneng.

International
As of 22 December 2009, he has won three caps for the Lesotho national football team.

Notes

Living people
Association football midfielders
Lesotho footballers
Lesotho international footballers
Year of birth missing (living people)